A heptathlon is a track and field combined events contest made up of seven events. The name derives from the Greek επτά (hepta, meaning "seven") and ἄθλος (áthlos, or ἄθλον, áthlon, meaning "competition"). A competitor in a heptathlon is referred to as a heptathlete.

There are two heptathlons – the men's and the women's heptathlon – composed of different events. The men's heptathlon is older and is held indoors, while the women's is held outdoors and was introduced in the 1980s, first appearing in the Olympics in 1984.

Women's heptathlon

Women's heptathlon is the combined event for women contested in the athletics programme of the Olympics and at the World Athletics Championships. The World Athletics Combined Events Tour determines a yearly women's heptathlon champion. The women's outdoor heptathlon consists of the following events, with the first four contested on the first day, and the remaining three on day two:

 100 metres hurdles
 High jump
 Shot put
 200 metres
 Long jump
 Javelin throw 
 800 metres

The heptathlon has been contested by female athletes since the early 1980s, when it replaced the pentathlon as the primary women's combined event contest (the javelin throw and 800 m were added). It was first contested at the Olympic level in the 1984 Summer Olympics. In recent years some women's decathlon competitions have been conducted, consisting of the same events as the men's competition in a slightly different order, and World Athletics has begun keeping records for it, but the heptathlon remains the championship-level combined event for women. Nafissatou Thiam, representing Belgium, is the 2020 Olympic Gold Medallist, after successfully defending her 2016 title. She is also the reigning World Champion and European Champion. Katarina Johnson-Thompson, representing Great Britain, is the current  Commonwealth Champion. Odile Ahouanwanou. Yekaterina Voronina, Kiara Reddingius, Luisarys Toledo and Ariana Ince hold the African, Asian, Oceanian, South American and NACAC (North American, Central American and Caribbean) titles respectively. Adriana Rodríguez, Marthe Koala, Swapna Barman and Elenani Tinai hold the Panamerican Games, African Games, Asian Games and Pacific Games titles respectively.

There is also a Tetradecathlon, which is a double heptathlon, consisting of 14 events, seven events per day.

Points system
The heptathlon scoring system was devised by Dr Karl Ulbrich, a Viennese mathematician. The formulae are constructed so that, for each event, a designated benchmark performance (for example, approximately 1.82 m for the high jump) scores 1000 points. Each event also has a minimum recordable performance level (e.g. 0.75 m for the high jump), corresponding to zero points. The formulae are devised so that successive constant increments in performance correspond to gradually increasing increments in points awarded.

The events are split into three groups, and the scores are calculated according to the three formulae:

Running events (200 m, 800 m and 100 m hurdles):

Jumping events (high jump and long jump):

Throwing events (shot put and javelin):

P is for points, T is for time in seconds, M is for height or length in centimeters and D is length in meters. a, b and c have different values for each of the events, as follows:

Benchmarks
The following table shows the benchmark levels needed to earn 1000, 900, 800 and 700 points in each event.

Women's world records compared with heptathlon bests

Men's heptathlon 
 

The other version is an indoor competition, normally contested by men only. It is the men's combined event in the IAAF World Indoor Championships in Athletics. The men's indoor heptathlon consists of the following events, with the first four contested on the first day, and remaining three on day two:

 60 metres
 long jump
 shot put
 high jump
 60 metres hurdles
 pole vault
 1000 metres

The scoring is similar for both versions. In each event, the athlete scores points for his performance in each event according to scoring tables issued by the International Association of Athletics Federations (IAAF). The athlete accumulating the highest number of points wins the competition.

Benchmarks
The following table shows the minimum benchmark levels required to earn 1000 points in each event.

Men's world records compared with heptathlon bests

All-time top 25

Women

Notes
Below is a list of all other scores equal or superior to 6875 pts:
Jackie Joyner-Kersee also scored 7215 (1988), 7158 (1986), 7148 (1986), 7128 (1987), 7044 (1992), 6979 (1987), 6910 (1986), 6878 (1991).
Carolina Klüft also scored 7001 (2003), 6952 (2004), 6887 (2005).
Nafissatou Thiam also scored 6947 (2022).
Jessica Ennis also scored 6906 (2012).
Sabine Paetz also scored 6897 (1988).
Larisa Nikitina also scored 6875 (1989).

Annulled marks
Tatyana Chernova scored 6880 (2011), this performance was annulled due to doping offence.

Men

Notes
Below is a list of all other scores equal or superior to 6319 pts:
Ashton Eaton also scored 6632 (2014), 6568 (2011), 6499 (2010), 6470 (2016).
Roman Šebrle also scored 6420 (2001), 6358 (2000), 6350 (2004), 6319 (1999).
Kyle Garland also scored 6415 (2023).
Kevin Mayer also scored 6392 (2021), 6348 (2018, 2023).
Sebastian Chmara also scored 6386 (1999).
Bryan Clay also scored 6365 (2004).
Damian Warner also scored 6343
Eelco Sintnicolaas also scored 6341 (2013).

Medalists

Women's Olympic medalists

Women's World Championships medalists

Men's World Indoor Championships medalists

Season's bests

Women's heptathlon

Men's indoor heptathlon

National records

Women's heptathlon
NR's equal or superior to 6200 pts:
Updated 23 November 2022.

Men's indoor heptathlon 
NR's equal or superior to 6000 pts:
Updated 18 March 2023.

See also

 Combined events at the Olympics

Other multiple event contests include:
Summer sports
 Biathle
 Duathlon
 Triathlon
 Quadrathlon
 Pentathlon (athletics)
 Pentathlon
 Modern pentathlon
 Hexathlon (primarily a youth or junior event) 
 Octathlon (primarily a youth or junior event although logistical problems have seen senior octathlons contested, for example at the 2007 South Pacific Games)
 Decathlon

Winter sports
 Biathlon
 Nordic combined

Other
 Chess-boxing

Notes

References

External links
 National Records
 IAAF combined events scoring tables and explanation
 IAAF list of heptathlon records in XML
 Heptathlon all-time list
 Heptathlon points counter 

Heptathlon
Combined track and field events
Events in track and field
Individual sports
Summer Olympic disciplines in athletics
Men's athletics
Women's athletics